The House is Empty (Spanish: La casa está vacía) is a 1945 Chilean drama film directed by Carlos Schlieper and starring Chela Bon, Alejandro Flores and Horacio Peterson.

Cast
 Chela Bon 
 Alejandro Flores 
 Horacio Peterson 
 Maria Teresa Squella
 Ernesto Vilches

References

Bibliography 
 Rist, Peter H. Historical Dictionary of South American Cinema. Rowman & Littlefield, 2014.

External links 
 

1945 films
1945 drama films
Chilean drama films
1940s Spanish-language films
Films directed by Carlos Schlieper
Chilean black-and-white films